The Far Horizons is a 1955 American Western film directed by Rudolph Maté, starring Fred MacMurray, Charlton Heston, Donna Reed and Barbara Hale. It is about the early 19th century Lewis and Clark Expedition, which was sent by President Thomas Jefferson to survey the territory that the United States has just acquired in the Louisiana Purchase from France. They are able to overcome the dangers they encounter along the way with the help of a Shoshone woman named Sacagawea. This is currently the only major American motion picture on the Lewis and Clark Expedition (although there have been television documentaries on the subject). Many details are fictional, and the minor scene where the group reaches the Pacific Ocean reflects the low budget of the film. The film was re-released in 1962 by Citation Films Inc. as Untamed West in a double feature with Jungle Attack.

Plot
An ambitious, historic attempt to explore and document an untamed American frontier unfolds in this rousing adventure drama. In 1803, Meriwether Lewis and William Clark, with President Thomas Jefferson's blessing, embarked on the government-sponsored Lewis and Clark Expedition – an attempt to discover a water route connecting St. Louis, Missouri, with the Pacific Ocean. After meeting the Shoshone woman Sacagawea in what has since become the state of North Dakota (but which was at the time unexplored territory) their trek takes them through the magnificent, danger-filled territory of the Pacific Northwest, with guidance from Sacagawea.

Cast
As appearing in screen credits (main roles identified):

 Fred MacMurray as Captain Meriwether Lewis 
 Charlton Heston as Lt. William Clark
 Donna Reed as Sacagawea
 Barbara Hale as Julia Hancock
 William Demarest as Sgt. Gass 
 Alan Reed as Charbonneau 
 Eduardo Noriega as Cameahwait
 Larry Pennell as Wild Eagle 
 Julia Montoya as Crow woman 
 Ralph Moody as Le Borgne 
 Herbert Heyes as President Thomas Jefferson
 Lester Matthews as Mr. Hancock
 Helen Wallace as  Mrs. Marsha Hancock
 Walter Reed as Cruzatte (helmsman)

Production
The film was known during production as The Blue Horizon. It was shot in Wyoming's Jackson Hole and Grand Teton National Park.

Reception
In 2011, Time Magazine rated The Far Horizons as one of the top ten most historically misleading films, in part due to its casting of Caucasian Donna Reed as Shoshone Sacagawea, and the creation of a romantic subplot between her character and William Clark, although Sacagawea's husband, French-Canadian trader Toussaint Charbonneau, was in real life also a member of the expedition.

See also
 List of American films of 1955

References

External links
 
 
 

1955 films
1955 Western (genre) films
1950s historical adventure films
American Western (genre) films
American historical adventure films
Biographical films about people of the American Old West
Cultural depictions of Meriwether Lewis and William Clark
Cultural depictions of Thomas Jefferson
Films directed by Rudolph Maté
Films scored by Hans J. Salter
Films set in Iowa
Films set in Missouri
Films set in Montana
Films set in Nebraska
Films set in North Dakota
Films set in Oregon
Films set in the 1800s
Paramount Pictures films
1950s English-language films
1950s American films